This is a list of reports on sport issues in Australia by the Parliament of Australia. These reports arise from inquiries conducted by Senate, House of Representatives and Joint Committees on current issues in sport. The reports provide evidence, discussion and recommendations. The reports can often result in the implementation of policies and legislation by the Australian Government.

 Payments to athletes and teams who did not participate at the 1980 Moscow Olympic Games by House of Representatives Standing Committee on Expenditure (1984)
 Sports aviation safety by House of Representatives Standing Committee on Transport Safety (1987)
 Drugs in sport : an interim report by Senate Standing Committee on Environment, Recreation and the Arts (1989)
 Going for gold : first report by House of Representatives Standing Committee on Finance and Public Administration (1989
 Can sport be brought? second report by House of Representatives Standing Committee on Finance and Public Administration (1990)
 Drugs in sport : second report by Senate Standing Committee on Environment, Recreation and the Arts (1990)
 Equine welfare in competitive events other than racing by Senate Select Committee on Animal Welfare (1991)
 The Circumstances Surrounding the Positive Drug Test on Mr Alex Watson by Senate Standing Committee on Environment, Recreation and the Arts (1992)
 Physical and sport education by Senate Standing Committee on Environment, Recreation and the Arts (1992)
 Inquiry into the Sydney 2000 Olympics : the adequacy of existing and planned aviation services and infrastructure by House of Representatives Standing Committee on Transport, Communication and Infrastructure (1994)
 Role of national sporting coaches in the international transfer of Australian players by Senate Environment, Recreation, Communications and the Arts References Committee (1995)
 Soccer : first report by Senate Environment, Recreation, Communications and the Arts References Committee (1995)
 Olympics 2000 ... and the winner is? by House of Representatives, Standing Committee on Industry, Science and Technology (1995)
 Cashing in on the Sydney Olympics : protecting the Olympics from ambush marketing by Senate Legal and Constitutional References Committee (1995).
 Rethinking the funding of community sporting and recreational facilities : a sporting chance by House of Representatives Standing Committee on Environment, Recreation and the Arts (1997)
 Going for gold : immigration entry arrangements for the Olympic and Paralympic Games by Joint Standing Committee on Migration (1999)
 Half way to equal : report of the inquiry into equal opportunity and equal status for women in Australia by House of Representatives Standing Committee on Legal and Constitutional Affairs (1992).
 About time! : women in sport and recreation in Australia by Senate Environment, Recreation, Communications and the Arts References Committee (2006)
 The reporting of sports news and the emergence of digital media by Standing Committee on Environment, Communications and the Arts (2009)
 Fifth report : the advertising and promotion of gambling services in sport : Broadcasting Services Amendment (Advertising for Sports Betting) Bill 2013 by Parliamentary Joint Select Committee on Gambling Reform (2013)
 Sport - more than just a game : contribution of sport to Indigenous wellbeing and mentoring by House of Representatives Standing Committee on Aboriginal and Torres Strait Islander Affairs (2013)
 Australian Sports Anti-Doping Authority Amendment Bill 2013 by Senate Standing Committees on Rural and Regional Affairs and Transport  (2013)
 Practice of sports science in Australia by Senate Standing Committees on Rural and Regional Affairs and Transport  (2013)
 Ticket scalping in Australia by Senate Economics References Committee (2014)
Future of rugby union in Australia by Senate Standing Committees on Community Affairs (2017)

External sources
 Australian Parliament - Parlinfo website - search to locate the electronic copies of reports.

References

Australia sport-related lists